Bugatti was a French car manufacturer of high-performance automobiles.

Bugatti may also refer to:

Bugatti automobiles
 Bugatti Automobiles S.A.S., a brand revival active from 1998 to the present, a subsidiary of Groupe VOLKSWAGEN France s.a.

Ettore Bugatti and relations
Carlo Bugatti (1856–1940), designer and cabinetmaker
Ettore Bugatti (1881–1947), founder of Bugatti, son of Carlo
Rembrandt Bugatti (1884–1916), sculptor, son of Carlo
Jean Bugatti (1909–1939), automotive designer and test engineer, eldest son of Ettore Bugatti
Roland Bugatti (1922–1977), automobile executive, son of Ettore Bugatti

Other
 Giovanni Battista Bugatti (1779–1869), official executioner for the Papal States from 1796 to 1865
 "Bugatti" (song), a song by American hip-hop artist Ace Hood
 "Bugatti", a song by Tiga (musician)
 Bugatti Circuit, permanent race track in France

See also